Daniel Johnston is an American neuroscientist, having held the Karl Folkers Chair in Interdisciplinary Biomedical Research at University of Texas at Austin.

References

Living people
University of Texas at Austin faculty
American neuroscientists
1947 births
Austrian neuroscientists
People from Graz in health professions